Bouchetcamaena is a genus of air-breathing land snails, terrestrial pulmonate gastropod mollusks in the family Camaenidae.

This is an alternate representation and debated synonym of Trichochloritis Pilsbry, 1891

Species
 Bouchetcamaena herosae Thach & F. Huber, 2020
 Bouchetcamaena maestrati Thach & F. Huber, 2020
 Bouchetcamaena thachi F. Huber, 2018
 Bouchetcamaena thachorum Thach, 2020
Synonyms
 Bouchetcamaena fouresi (Morlet, 1886) represented as Trichochloritis fouresi (Morlet, 1886)
 Bouchetcamaena huberi Thach, 2018 represented as Trichochloritis fouresi (Morlet, 1886) (debated synonym)
 Bouchetcamaena caseus (L. Pfeiffer, 1860): synonym of Chloritis caseus (L. Pfeiffer, 1860)
 Bouchetcamaena condoriana (Crosse & P. Fischer, 1863): synonym of Bellatrachia condoriana (Crosse & P. Fischer, 1863)
 Bouchetcamaena nasuta (Bavay & Dautzenberg, 1909): synonym of Chloritis nasuta (Bavay & Dautzenberg, 1909)
 Bouchetcamaena thachi F. Huber, 2020: synonym of Bouchetcamaena thachorum Thach, 2020 (invalid: junior homonym of Bouchetcamaena thachi F. Huber, 2018; B. thachorum is a replacement name)

References

 Thach, N. N. (2018). New shells of South Asia. Seashells-Landsnails-Freshwater Shells. 3 New Genera, 132 New Species & Subspecies. 48HRBooks Company, Akron, Ohio, USA. 173 pp.
 Páll-Gergely, B.; Hunyadi, A.; Auffenberg, K. (2020). Taxonomic vandalism in malacology: comments on molluscan taxa recently described by N. N. Thach and colleagues (2014–2019). Folia Malacologia. 28(1): 35–76.
 Thach N. N. (2021). Rejected synonyms in MolluscaBase. The Festivus. 53(1): 63–66.

External links

Camaenidae